The Treaty of Lieben was signed on June 25, 1608 between Holy Roman Emperor Rudolf II and his brother, Matthias. Based on the terms of the treaty, Rudolf surrendered Hungary, Austrian territories near the Danube River, and Moravia to Matthias. In return, Matthias gave to the emperor the territories of Tyrol and Vorlande.

See also
List of treaties

References

Sources
Encyclopædia Britannica - Austria

Hungary under Habsburg rule
Lieben
17th century in Austria
1608 treaties
1608 in the Habsburg monarchy
Rudolf II, Holy Roman Emperor